Presidential elections were held in Somaliland on 26 June 2010. The elections were originally scheduled for August 2008 and numerous delays, endangered political stability in the country. On 1 July 2010, the Somaliland National Election Commission announced that opposition candidate Ahmed Mohamed Mohamoud had won the elections, defeating incumbent President Dahir Riyale Kahin.

Background
The elections were originally scheduled for 31 August 2008, but the instability in the eastern Sanaag and Sool regions led the Guurti to extend the incumbent's term for a year in early April 2008, setting the election for 15 March 2009. This was heavily criticised by the opposition—in the end, a compromise led to the date of 6 April 2009, which was later changed to one week before that (29 March). On 3 March, it was announced that the elections were postponed by two more months, to be held on 31 May.

On 6 September 2009, the electoral commission announced that the election could not be held on the day planned, 27 September, due to "current political, economic and technical conditions". A new date was not announced. President Dahir Riyale Kahin subsequently asked the Guurti for yet another term extension since it would expire on 29 September, but was denied this. On 28 September however, it was reported that on a second vote, the term extension was granted, provided that the government adheres to a six-point proposal to organise the next elections.

Somaliland politicians then expected the election to be held in January 2010 at the earliest. Later, April 2010 was mentioned, but it soon became clear this date would also be missed. The elections were then expected for June 2010, as the preparations for the elections were underway. The first ballot boxes for the election arrived from Denmark on 19 April, and new voter registration cards will be issued from the second week of May. Somaliland's electoral commission backed a June election on 28 April 2010, stating the voters list had been updated and now contains 1.1 million people.

Conduct
After a two-year delay, voting for the presidential elections finally took place in late June 2010. A team of international observers led by Progressio, a UK-based development agency (formerly known as the Catholic Institute for International Relations) that has long been an advocate for independence movements, described the process as "free and fair", although they noted violence in the disputed eastern Sool region that led to the death of an election official.

The International Republican Institute asserted that "Somaliland’s election was peaceful, without major incident and generally met international standards. Hundreds of thousands of Somalilanders turned out to vote in their fourth election, and although wanting international recognition, did not wait to continue to build their nascent democracy. The international community should credit such democratic progress and the example it sets for others."

Results
The Somaliland National Election Commission announced the results on 1 July 2010, the fiftieth anniversary of independence from Britain. They showed that Ahmed M. Mahamoud Silanyo had won the presidential election with just under 50% of the vote, defeating incumbent president Dahir Riyale Kahin, who received 33%.

Aftermath
After the results were announced, Kahin congratulated Silanyo and reiterated that he would step down. Silanyo was sworn in on 27 July at a ceremony.

References

Elections in Somaliland
Somaliland
Election
Election and referendum articles with incomplete results